Schalk is both a patronymic surname and a Germanic given name. As a given name, with the meaning "servant", it has been recorded as early as the 8th century as Scalco and Scalcho.  The composite given name "Godschalk" or "Gottschalk" (God's servant) was more popular with the higher classes. Quite common in the Low Countries in the Middle Ages, it is now primarily an Afrikaans given name. Notable people with the name include:

Given name
 Schalk Booysen (1927–2011), South African sprinter and middle distance runner
 Schalk Brits (born 1981), South African rugby player
 Schalk Burger (born 1956), South African rugby player using the name Burger Geldenhuys
 Schalk Burger (born 1983), South African rugby player
 Schalk Willem Burger (1852–1918), acting President of South Africa (1900-02)
 Schalk Ferreira (born 1984), South African rugby player
 Schalk Joubert (born 1975), South African bass player
 Schalk Oelofse (born 1988), South African rugby player
 Schalk van der Merwe (1961–2016), South African tennis player
 Schalk van der Merwe (rugby union) (born 1990), South African rugby player
 Schalk Verhoef (1935–1997), Dutch road cyclist

Surname
 Alex Schalk (born 1992), Dutch footballer
 Carl Schalk (born 1929), American church music composer
 Chaim Schalk (born 1986), Canadian beach volleyball player
 D. J. Schalk, pseudonym of David Kalisch (1820-1872), German playwright and humorist
 Franz Schalk (1863–1931), Austrian conductor
 Gertrude Schalk (1906–1977), African-American writer, columnist, and newspaper editor
 Henriette Goverdine Anna van der Schalk (1869–1952), Dutch poet and socialist
 Jeff Schalk (born 1974), American mountain bike racer
 Johann Schalk (1903–1987), German World War II fighter ace
 (1850–1919), German painter
 Joseph Schalk (1857–1900), Austrian conductor, musicologist and pianist; older brother of Franz Schalk
 Louis Schalk (1926–2002), American test pilot
 Peter Schalk (born 1961), Dutch politician
 Ray Schalk (1892–1970), American baseball player, coach, manager and scout
 Roy Schalk (1908–1990), American baseball player and manager

See also
 FC Schalke 04, German football club
 Schalks, New Jersey, unincorporated community in the United States
 Schellekens, a Dutch surname with the same origin

References

Patronymic surnames